Idora Hegel (born 13 April 1983, in Zagreb) is a Croatian former competitive figure skater. She is the 2004 Golden Spin of Zagreb champion and a seven-time (2000–05, 2007) Croatian national champion. She represented 2002 Winter Olympics in Salt Lake City and at the 2006 Winter Olympics in Turin. At both events, she qualified for the free skate and finished 19th overall. She also reached the free skate at sixteen ISU Championships – six Worlds, seven Europeans, and three Junior Worlds.

Programs

Competitive highlights
GP: Grand Prix; JGP: Junior Grand Prix

References

External links 

 

1983 births
Living people
Figure skaters at the 2007 Winter Universiade
Croatian female single skaters
Olympic figure skaters of Croatia
Figure skaters at the 2006 Winter Olympics
Figure skaters at the 2002 Winter Olympics
Sportspeople from Zagreb
Competitors at the 2005 Winter Universiade
21st-century Croatian women